Horst Kirasitsch (born 30 November 1960) is a retired Austrian football player and a football manager who last managed USC Mank.

Playing career

Kirasitsch played as a goalkeeper for First Vienna FC, Kremser SC, VSE St. Pölten, SV Stockerau and SV Würmla.

Coaching career

Kirasitsch managed in the Austrian lower divisions between 1999 and 2008. He managed two clubs which he featured for during his playing career - Kremser SC and SKN St. Pölten.

Coaching record

References

External links
 

1960 births
Living people
Austrian footballers
Austrian football managers
SKN St. Pölten players
First Vienna FC players
SV Würmla players
SKN St. Pölten managers
Association football goalkeepers
People from Sankt Pölten
Footballers from Lower Austria